Tibetan astrology is a traditional discipline of the Tibetan peoples that has influence from  both Chinese astrology and Hindu astrology. Tibetan astrology is one of the 'Ten Sciences' (Wylie: rig-pa'i gnas bcu; Sanskrit: daśavidyā) in the enumeration honoured by this cultural tradition.

In the Tibetan Buddhist medical and tantric traditions, astrology is not regarded as superstition but rather as a practical tool to understand and heal our body and mind on the gross, subtle and very subtle levels. One can experience many sicknesses and misfortunes due to outer, inner and secret astrological reactions and malevolent celestial influences.

Year-signs
The Year-signs cycle in an archetypal progression or continuüm:
Rat
Ox
Tiger
Rabbit
Dragon
Snake
Horse
Goat
Monkey
Rooster
Dog
Pig

Tibetan Astrological Animal Sign & Element

 * Note: The start date of Losar depends on what time zone one is in. For example, in 2005, Losar started on February 8 in U.S. time zones and February 9 in Asia time zones. Some people began celebrating Losar on February 9 in the US. The Tibetan new year is based on a fluctuating point that marks the New Moon that is nearest to the beginning of February. It is important to note that, despite their apparent similarities, the start of the Tibetan and Chinese New Years can sometimes differ by a whole month.

Favourable & Non Favourable  Day by Animal Sign 
This calendar is based on Tibetan Astrology and is calculated for midday in European Std Time ( GMT+2)

Table below show the  days of the weeks (and corresponding planets) that are considered generally favourable or not favourable for the 12 Tibetan astrological signs.

For the start of new or important activities it is advisable to avoid the unfavourable week days  in the calendar.

Vaiḍūrya dKar-po (White Beryl) 
The names of the chapters of the Vaiḍūrya dKar-po (the premier Tibetan text on astrological divination) are :
1.  "Aspects of Turtle Divination"
2.  "Hidden Points"
3.  "Geomantic Aspects"
10. "The Thirty Computational Charts"
11. "The Thirteen Charts"

See also

 Jyotisha (Indian astrology)
 Chinese astrology
 Losar
 Tibetan calendar
 Culture of Tibet
 Tibetan people
 Tibet
 Tibet Autonomous Region

Notes

Further reading
 Cornu, Philippe  Tibetan Astrology. Shambhala, 1997. .
 Desi Sangye Gyatso, Lochen Dharmasri and Gyurme Dorje White Beryl: Tibetan Elemental Divination Paintings. Eskenazi, 2001. 
 Berzin, A. Tibetan Astrology and Astronomy. in Maitreya Magazine (Emst, Holland), vol. 11, no. 4 (1989).
 Berzin, A.  Tibetan Astro Studies. in Chö-Yang, Year of Tibet Edition (Dharamsala, India), (1991).
 Namkhai Norbu Rinpoche Key for Consulting the Tibetan Calendar. Shang Shung Edizioni, 2003.

External links
 བོད་གཞུང་སྨན་རྩི་ཁང་། Men-Tsi-Khang Institute of Medicine & Astrology of H.H. the Dalai Lama, Dharamsala India.
 The Tibetan Astrology Network
 Tibetan Astro Sciences: Basic Principles - Dr. Alexander Berzin
Digital Tibetan Buddhist Altar See the "Weekly Tibetan Astrology" feature and related background resources. Includes extensive information on yearly Tibetan astrology, inclusive of moving elements, spirits, parkha and mewa.

 
Astrology by tradition